Alycia Washington (born November 18, 1990) is an American rugby union player. She was named in the Eagles 2017 Women's Rugby World Cup squad. She was in the squad that played at the 2016 Women's Rugby Super Series. Her Uncle is the Chicago Bulls Basketball Legend Scott Burell.

References

External links
 Alycia Washington at USA Rugby
 Alycia Washington at New York Rugby Club
 

1990 births
Living people
American female rugby union players
Rugby union players from Connecticut
United States women's international rugby union players
University of Connecticut alumni
21st-century American women